Microstigmatidae is a small family of spiders with about 25 described species in eight genera. They are small ground-dwelling and free-living spiders that make little use of silk.

The family was removed from the family Dipluridae in 1981. The subfamily Pseudonemesiinae from the family Ctenizidae was also transferred into the Microstigmatidae.

Genera
, the World Spider Catalog recognized the following genera:
Angka Raven & Schwendinger, 1995
Envia Ott & Höfer, 2003
Ixamatus Simon, 1887
Kiama Main & Mascord, 1969
Micromygale Platnick & Forster, 1982
Microstigmata Strand, 1932
Ministigmata Raven & Platnick, 1981
Pseudonemesia Caporiacco, 1955
Spelocteniza Gertsch, 1982
Tonton Passanha, Cizauskas & Brescovit, 2019
Xamiatus Raven, 1981
Xenonemesia Goloboff, 1989

References

Notes

Bibliography 
 Ott, R. & Höfer, H. (2003). Envia garciai, a new genus and species of mygalomorph spiders (Araneae, Microstigmatidae) from Brazilian Amazonia. - Iheringia 93: 373-379. PDF
 Indicatti, Rafael P.; Lucas, Sylvia M.; Ott, Ricardo & Brescovit, Antonio D. (2008): Litter dwelling mygalomorph spiders (Araneae: Microstigmatidae, Nemesiidae) from Araucaria forests in southern Brazil, with the description of five new species. Revista Brasileira de Zoologia 25(3): 529-546.

 
Mygalomorphae families
Taxa named by Carl Friedrich Roewer